Michael Glenn (born 14 June 1956) was an English cricketer. He was a right-handed batsman and a right-arm medium-fast bowler who played first-class cricket for Derbyshire.

A Belper native, the youngster, only eighteen at the time of his debut first-class appearance in 1975, had represented the team in the Second XI Championship since the previous season. He was only able to inspire the Derbyshire team to finish third-bottom of the County Championship table in 1975, however, with the hope of changing fortunes the following season, he was only to see play in two more first-class games, and having barely turned 20, found himself out of the first-team. Glenn also briefly played for the Second XI teams of Northamptonshire and Worcestershire.

Glenn was a lower order batsman who often found himself partnered with Test player Mike Hendrick during his short stint in the Second XI in the absence of Alan Ward.

External links
Michael Glenn at CricketArchive 

1956 births
English cricketers
Living people
Derbyshire cricketers
Northamptonshire cricketers
Worcestershire cricketers
People from Belper
Cricketers from Derbyshire